Jesse Francis McComas (June 9, 1911 – April 19, 1978) was an American science fiction editor. McComas wrote several stories on his own in the 1950s using both his own name and the pseudonym Webb Marlowe.

He entered publishing in 1941 as a salesman and editorial representative, spending two years in New York with Random House. He returned to California in 1944, working as the Pacific Coast editorial representative for Henry Holt and Company. For Simon & Schuster he became their Northern California sales manager and general editorial representative.

McComas was the co-editor, with Raymond J. Healy, of one of the first major American anthologies of science fiction, Adventures in Time and Space (1946). Within a few years, he was the co-founding editor, with Anthony Boucher, of The Magazine of Fantasy & Science Fiction.  He edited the magazine from its inception in 1949 as The Magazine of Fantasy. In the fall of 1954 he left the magazine as an active editor but continued in the role of advisory editor until 1962.

During the 1950s, McComas reviewed science fiction for The New York Times.

He left to the San Francisco Public Library his collection of 3,000 volumes of fiction and 92 science fiction magazines dating from the 1920s.

References

External links
 
 
 
 McComas Collection of Fantasy and Science Fiction at San Francisco Public Library 
 

1911 births
1978 deaths
20th-century American non-fiction writers
American magazine founders
American magazine editors
Science fiction editors
The Magazine of Fantasy & Science Fiction
University of California, Berkeley alumni
Writers from Kansas City, Missouri